The Hateful Eight is a 2015 American Revisionist Western film written and directed by Quentin Tarantino. It stars Samuel L. Jackson, Kurt Russell, Jennifer Jason Leigh, Walton Goggins, Demián Bichir, Tim Roth, Michael Madsen, and Bruce Dern as eight strangers who seek refuge from a blizzard in a stagecoach stopover, a decade after the American Civil War. The film was theatrically released by The Weinstein Company on December 25, 2015. It grossed $156.5 million worldwide and was met with generally favorable reviews from critics. 

The film was praised for its screenplay, score, cinematography, and Leigh's performance. It is the first Tarantino film to feature an original score, which was composed by Ennio Morricone. At the Academy Awards, Leigh received a nomination for Best Supporting Actress, Robert Richardson was nominated for Best Cinematography, and Morricone received the Oscar for Best Original Score. At the BAFTA Awards, the film was also nominated for Best Actress in a Supporting Role and Best Original Screenplay, and won Best Original Music. The Golden Globes gave the film nominations in the same categories and awarded Morricone for Best Original Score. Morricone also received two Grammy nominations for his composition. The National Board of Review awarded the film with Best Supporting Actress and Best Original Screenplay, and named The Hateful Eight one of the top ten films of 2015.

Accolades

Notes

References

External links 
 

Hateful Eight, The
Hateful Eight, The